
Year 88 BC was a year of the pre-Julian Roman calendar. At the time it was known as the Year of the Consulship of Sulla and Rufus (or, less frequently, year 666 Ab urbe condita) and the First Year of Houyuan. The denomination 88 BC for this year has been used since the early medieval period, when the Anno Domini calendar era became the prevalent method in Europe for naming years.

Events 
 By place 

 Roman Republic 
 The Social War ends with the defeat of the Italian allies by the Romans. Lucius Cornelius Sulla, age 50, becomes the first Roman commander to march on Rome with his army and to capture the city by force. This extraordinary act is prompted by his desire to maintain his proconsular command for the First Mithridatic War in Asia Minor.
 The First Roman Civil War starts with an uprising led by Gaius Marius, but the populares under the tribune P. Sulpicius Rufus are crushed by the optimates under Sulla.  Marius flees to Africa.
 First Civil War in Rome, between Marius and Sulla. Some Italian cities are destroyed: for instance, Forlì, rebuilt by the praetor Livius Clodius afterwards.
 The Dardani, Scordisci, and the Maedi attack the Roman province of Macedonia.

 Greece 
 May – King Mithridates VI of Pontus invades Greece. Defeating the Roman forces four times in succession, he conquers Bithynia, Phrygia, Mysia, Lycia, Pamphylia, Ionia and Cappadocia. The Roman province of Asia is dismantled. On the king's orders, the local authorities in every city of the province round up and put to death all resident Italians in a single day (App.Mith.§§85–91). Plutarch (Sulla 24.4) says that 150,000 are killed, other sources calculate a figure of 80,000 people.

 China 
 Emperor Wu of Han makes preparations for the six-year-old Liu Fuling to be made Crown Prince and establishes Huo Guang as the future regent. The emperor executes Fuling's mother Lady Gouyi so that she cannot dominate the state while Fuling is a child emperor.

Births

Deaths 
 Demetrius III Eucaerus, king of the Seleucid Empire
 Gnaeus Domitius Ahenobarbus, Roman consul 
 Lady Gouyi, mother of Zhao of Han (b. 113)
 Manius Aquillius, Roman consul and general
 Ptolemy X Alexander I, king (pharaoh) of Egypt
 Publius Sulpicius Rufus, Roman statesman
 Quintus Mucius Scaevola Augur, Roman consul
 Quintus Poppaedius Silo, Italian tribe leader

References